The hectometre (International spelling as used by the International Bureau of Weights and Measures; SI symbol: hm) or hectometer (American spelling) is a unit of length in the International System of Units (SI), equal to one hundred metres and to one tenth of a kilometre. The word comes from a combination of "metre" and the SI prefix "hecto-", meaning "hundred". It is not commonly used in English. A football field (either soccer or American) is approximately 1 hectometre in length.  The hectare (ha), a common metric unit for land area, is equal to one square hectometre (hm2).

See also
Orders of magnitude (length)
Conversion of units

References

External links 
 

+02
Metre